SM*SH or 7 Man as 7 Heroes, ( or ), is a boy band from Indonesia, founded by Star signal on April 10, 2010. This boyband consists of Rafael, Rangga, Morgan, Bisma, Dicky, Reza, & Ilham. Together, they perform songs that are pop dance oriented. The name SM*SH stands for you heroes meaning that they want to young people by bringing positive spirits through their song. The letter "A" that's replaced by the star symbol was inspired by the name of their management, Star signal. Currently, SM*SH is also working under the "Ancora Music" label since the mid 2011. Their 1st studio album that was released world wide is titled SM*SH (self titled). Their well known singles, include "I Heart You", "Senyum Semangat", & "Ada Cinta". SM*SH has changed the Indonesian music industry by popularizing the boyband culture in the year 2011. Now, the Indonesian music industry is dominated by various boybands & also girlbands. Up until recently, SM*SH had received 8 awards & 2 nominations in 2011, including 2 awards from the Indonesia Kids Choice Awards 2011.

Career

2010: Early form
Star signal included them in a 5 months training camp, where they sharpened their singing, dancing, & public speaking ability. Early in their career, SM*SH also took part in the dancing competition held by Cinta Laura, & become the background dancers in Laura's single. Later in September 2010, they released their debut single, titled "I Heart You". The song was then rearranged by the artists, & changed into "Cenat Cenut". Both of the 2 songs are controversial due to their energetic video clips

2011: SM*SH and Cinta Cenat Cenut
Cinta Cenat Cenut is the 1st television series, starring the members of the SM*SH alone, & they became the main character in this series. The show is aired on Trans TV since February 18, 2011. In this series, SM*SH acted with other Indonesian artists, such as Natasha Rizki & Zaneta Georgina. Because of this, they started getting advertising contracts from Telkomsel, & they also become the face of 'Sosis So Nice' advertisements. On April 10, 2011, they celebrated their 1st anniversary in "Hip Hip Hura Tolak Angin Karnaval SCTV 2011", which took place in the field Lumintang Denpasar, Bali. Despite the unfortunate weather conditions, the fans of SM*SH, "(Sm*sh blast)", remained ecstatically shouting & singing along. On March 6, 2011, SM*SH released a 2nd single, entitled "Senyum Semangat". Their 1st live performance of this eurodance song was aired by "Inbox" SCTV. Consequently, this song reach the top on the charts Indonesia.

In the event Indonesia music awards, "SCTV Music Awards 2011", SM*SH was invited to read the nomination for "New Arrivals Album Duo Group". They also performed their single, "I Heart You", with another well known Indonesian singer, Afgan. Apart from that, they also sang "Senyum Semangat". At the launch of their official website, (Sm*sh blast) www.smash blast.co.id, they said that they're in the process of writing new songs & recording their up coming album. On June 26, 2011, SM*SH released his 1st studio album, titled SM*SH named as its own name or so called self titled. The album contains 10 songs including 4 recycled songs. SM*SH debut album were also sold in Indonesian out lets of KFC.

In October 2011, SM*SH released their debut album in Malaysia & Singapore to achieve success abroad, especially in Southeast Asia. On October 30, 2011, SM*SH held a mini concert, titled "SM*SH Untukmu Indonesia". The concert was held at the Arena Sports Mall Kelapa Gading, North Jakarta. After the success of their TV series, they're coming back for a second season, Cinta Cenat Cenut 2. The 2nd season began airing in Trans TV on December 3, at 8.30 pm.

In 2012, SM*SH is planning on going world wide with their music.

2013: Morgan leaving SM*SH and won Mnet Asian Music Awards
Morgan announced he was leaving SM*SH in October, & he moved to be as actor for soap opera Surat Kecil Untuk Tuhan the series with Nikita Willy. In November 22, they won Mnet Asian Music Awards as the Best Asian Artist in Indonesia region.

2018: Comeback
After a hiatus of 5 years, SM*SH decided to make a comeback with a new single titled "Fenomena" under the label "401 Music" on July 18, 2018.

Members 
Current
Rafael Landry Tanubrata (2010-present)
Rangga Dewamoela (2010-present)
Bisma Karisma (2010-present)
Dicky Muhammad Prasetya (2010-present)
Muhammad Reza Anugrah (2010-present)
Muhammad Ilham Fauzi (2010-present)

Former
Handi Morgan Winata (2010-2013)

Timeline

Discography
Studio album
 SM*SH (2011)
 Step Forward (2012)

Single

Music video

Filmography

Awards and nominations

References 

Musical groups established in 2010
Indonesian boy bands
MAMA Award winners
2010 establishments in Indonesia